Ray MacSharry (born 29 April 1938) is a former Irish Fianna Fáil politician who served as Tánaiste from March 1982 to December 1982, European Commissioner for Agriculture and Rural Development from 1989 to 1993, Minister for Finance from March 1982 to December 1982 and 1987 to 1988, Minister for Agriculture from 1979 to 1981, Minister of State at the Department of the Public Service from 1978 to 1979. He served as a Teachta Dála (TD) for the Sligo–Leitrim constituency from 1969 to 1988. He also served as Member of the European Parliament (MEP) for the Connacht–Ulster constituency.

Early life
Born in Sligo, MacSharry was educated at the local national school before later briefly attending Summerhill College. After leaving school he worked as a livestock dealer throughout County Sligo and County Mayo, before becoming involved in the Meat Exporters Factory in his native town. MacSharry also owned his own haulage firm.

Political career

Beginnings
MacSharry came from a non-political family, however, he himself became an active member of Fianna Fáil in Sligo. In 1967, he made his first move into politics when he secured election to both Sligo Borough Council and Sligo County Council. It was from this local base that MacSharry launched his national election campaign.

MacSharry was first elected to Dáil Éireann as a Fianna Fáil TD for the Sligo–Leitrim constituency at the 1969 general election. It was a fourth general election triumph in succession for the party, however, he spent his first term on the backbenches. MacSharry was re-elected to the Dáil at the 1973 general election, however, Fianna Fáil were out of power as a Fine Gael–Labour Party government came to power.

In Taoiseach Jack Lynch's subsequent front bench reshuffle, MacSharry was appointed Opposition Spokesperson on the Office of Public Works.

Following the 1977 general election, Fianna Fáil returned to government with a massive twenty-seat Dáil majority. In spite of entering his third term MacSharry was left on the backbenches. With the introduction of the new Minister of State positions in 1978, he secured a junior ministerial post for the first time, as Minister of State at the Department of the Public Service.

Cabinet minister
In 1979, Jack Lynch suddenly announced his resignation as Taoiseach and as Fianna Fáil leader. The subsequent leadership contest was a straight battle between George Colley and Charles Haughey. Colley was the favoured choice of the outgoing leadership and of the majority of the cabinet while Haughey had the backing of a large rump of backbench TDs who had become disillusioned with the party leadership. MacSharry, in spite of serving as junior minister to Colley, was one of the strongest supporters of Haughey and even ended up nominating him for the position of party leader. Haughey succeeded in becoming party leader, albeit by a narrow margin of just six votes, and was later elected Taoiseach by the Dáil.

MacSharry's loyalty was subsequently rewarded when he was appointed Minister for Agriculture in the new government. Agriculture was viewed as a key portfolio in Haughey's new cabinet and MacSharry was regarded as an effective Minister at a time when farm prices were falling. He was also successful in agricultural negotiations with the EEC.

Following the 1981 general election, Fianna Fáil were out of power. In the new Fianna Fáil front bench MacSharry was retained as Spokesperson for Agriculture, but a later reshuffle saw him move to fisheries.

Fianna Fáil returned to office following the February 1982 general election and MacSharry was appointed as Tánaiste and Minister for Finance. At a time when Ireland was going through a recession, MacSharry introduced a budget which increased income tax at all levels. It was his only budget as the government fell after just nine months in office and a new coalition government of Fine Gael and the Labour Party took office.

1983 bugging scandal
In 1983, MacSharry resigned from the Fianna Fáil front bench due to the a phone tapping scandal, when it was revealed that as Tánaiste and Minister for Finance, he had borrowed police tape recorders to secretly record conversations with a cabinet colleague. He defended his action by saying that rumours were sweeping the party that he could be 'bought' (bribed) to support efforts to depose Haughey; he claimed he used the equipment to record any attempts made to offer bribes. The scandal was however primarily focused on the decision by the Minister for Justice, Seán Doherty, to bug the phones of two leading political journalists to discover their anti-Haughey sources. MacSharry was a secondary but high-profile casualty of the scandal, as the equipment he had used had been supplied by Doherty, who had requested it from Assistant Garda Commissioner Joseph Ainsworth. Ainsworth was also forced to resign when the scandal reached the headlines.

Political comeback and European Commissioner
MacSharry spent a number of years in the political wilderness following the phone-tapping scandal. He was elected to the European Parliament as an MEP for Connacht–Ulster at the 1984 election.

Following the 1987 general election, MacSharry was returned to the Dáil. He resigned his European Parliament seat when he was appointed again as Minister for Finance in Haughey's new government. During his second tenure in charge of finance, MacSharry committed himself to bringing order to the public finances and the poor economic situation. His ruthless cutting of state spending earned him the nickname Mack the Knife.

During this time he came to be identified as Haughey's heir apparent as Taoiseach and Fianna Fáil leader. MacSharry, however, had no such aspirations and had actually wanted to leave politics by the time he was forty-five. He was now fifty and had achieved some of the highest offices in the government of Ireland. In 1988, MacSharry's loyalty to Haughey was rewarded when he was appointed European Commissioner. As a result of this he resigned his Dáil seat, ending his domestic political career.

MacSharry was the first European Commissioner for Agriculture to work out a meaningful compromise on reform of the Common Agricultural Policy in 1992. The MacSharry reforms marked the turning point between the old CAP policy, and the new, although many other reforms followed his.

Retirement from politics
Following the completion of his term as European Commissioner, MacSharry retired from politics to pursue business interests. He is currently a director on the boards of a variety of companies including Bank of Ireland and Ryanair Holdings. In 1999, he was appointed chairman of Eircom plc. MacSharry is also a member of the Comite d'Honneur of the Institute of European Affairs.

MacSharry is a non-executive director of Irish Life and Permanent and receives pension payments of €88,936 every year.

Private life
MacSharry was married to Elaine and the couple had six children. One of his sons, Marc MacSharry, has served as a Councillor on Sligo County Council, as a Senator in Seanad Éireann representing the Industrial and Commercial Panel from 2002 to 2016, and as a TD for the constituency of Sligo–Leitrim since 2016. His nephew Tom MacSharry was a Councillor on Sligo Borough Council, 2004–09, and served as Mayor in 2006–07.

See also
Families in the Oireachtas

References

External links

 

 

   

1938 births
Living people
Alumni of the University of Galway
Fianna Fáil MEPs
Fianna Fáil TDs
Irish European Commissioners
Institute of European Affairs
Ministers for Finance (Ireland)
Members of the 19th Dáil
Members of the 20th Dáil
Members of the 21st Dáil
Members of the 22nd Dáil
Members of the 23rd Dáil
Members of the 24th Dáil
Members of the 25th Dáil
MEPs for the Republic of Ireland 1984–1989
Ministers for Agriculture (Ireland)
Ministers of State of the 21st Dáil
Ministers for Transport (Ireland)
People educated at Summerhill College
People from Sligo (town)
Politicians from County Sligo
Tánaistí
European Commissioners 1989–1992